Ebrington Manor is a grade II listed manor house in the parish of Ebrington in Gloucestershire, England. Since 1476 it has been a seat of the Fortescue family, since 1789 Earls Fortescue.

Location

It is located within the village of Ebrington in  Gloucestershire, immediately to the south-west of the parish church of Ebrington.

History

The house dates back to the fourteenth or fifteenth century, and was significantly altered twice, in the seventeenth and nineteenth centuries. It was built on land purchased by Sir John Fortescue (c.1394-1479), who was Chief Justice of the King's Bench.

An heraldic cartouche above the entrance door displays the arms of Fortescue impaling Aylmer, representing Hugh Fortescue (1665–1719), and his second wife Lucy Aylmer, whom he married after 1708, a daughter of Matthew Aylmer, 1st Baron Aylmer (circa 1650–1720), grandparents of Hugh Fortescue, 1st Earl Fortescue (1753-1841).

During World War II the house was run by the American Red Cross for rest and recuperation for United States Army Air Forces bomber crews. In 1970 the house was the location of an attempted murder and arson.

The current Earl has three daughters and no sons. Therefore the family has been involved in a campaign to change inheritance laws.

It was listed as a grade II building by English Heritage on 25 August 1960.

Architecture

The limestone building has grey slate roofs and a central five flue chimney. The main body of the house includes a 17th centy hall and balustraded gallery. There is extensive plasterwork throughout the house, some of which was moved from a summerhouse in the grounds. The main entrance gate piers and the summer-house in the grounds are both grade II* listed buildings. The garden was laid put in the 1940s.

See also
 Rental Refund Problems We had intended to visit The Manor for a week this August 2022. Unfortunately my wife had a burst appendix and we had to cancel our entire trip, including our stay at The Manor. According to their own Terms and Conditions we are entitled to a 50% deposit. We have been attempting to recover this deposit ever since. It is now December and they have still refused to even acknowledge us.
Castle Hill, Filleigh, Devon, principal seat of the Earls Fortescue until the death of the 5th Earl in 1958, who bequeathed it to his eldest daughter, Lady Margaret Fortescue, and bequeathed Weare Giffard Hall in Devon to his younger daughter. His brother and heir, the 6th Earl, was thus left with Ebrington as his seat, a more modest, although more ancient, possession of the Fortescue family.
Viscount Ebrington, secondary title of Earl Fortescue, borne as a courtesy title by his eldest son and heir apparent, who frequently resided at Ebrington during his father's lifetime.

References

Country houses in Gloucestershire
Grade II listed buildings in Gloucestershire
Fortescue family